Gairdoch Football Club was a Scottish association football club based in the village of Carronshore, Stirlingshire. The club was founded in 1886 and disbanded in 1896. The club competed in the Scottish Cup for three seasons between 1888 and 1890 as well as the regional Stirlingshire Cup competition. The club's home colours were black and white striped shirts with white shorts until 1889 when they changed to blue shirts with dark shorts.

References 

Defunct football clubs in Scotland
Association football clubs established in 1886
1886 establishments in Scotland
Association football clubs disestablished in 1896
1896 disestablishments in Scotland
Football in Falkirk (council area)